Timothy Van Patten (born June 10, 1959) is an American director, actor, screenwriter, and producer. He has directed episodes of Perry Mason, Boardwalk Empire,  Black Mirror, Deadwood, Ed, Game of Thrones, The Pacific, Rome, Sex and the City, The Sopranos, and The Wire.

As an actor, he is perhaps best known for portraying Mario "Salami" Pettrino on The White Shadow. He also played the villainous teenager Peter Stegman in Class of 1984 and Max Keller on The Master.

Personal life
Van Patten was born in Brooklyn, New York, to Richard Byron Van Patten and his second wife Eleanor della Gatta Van Patten and grew up in Massapequa, New York. He is the half-brother of Dick Van Patten and Joyce Van Patten, and the uncle of Vincent Van Patten and Talia Balsam. He graduated from Massapequa High School in 1977, in the same class as musician Brian Setzer and football player Brian Baldinger. His daughter is actress Grace Van Patten.

Career

Awards
In 2001, together with Terence Winter, Van Patten won both the Edgar Award and Writers Guild of America Award for Episodic Drama for The Sopranos episode "Pine Barrens," directed by Steve Buscemi. In 2004, Van Patten directed an episode called "Long Term Parking," which won the Primetime Emmy Award for Outstanding Writing for a Drama Series.

He has been nominated at the Primetime Emmy Awards on ten occasions for directing: The Sopranos episodes "Amour Fou", "Whoever Did This", "Long Term Parking" and "Members Only", The Pacific episode "Okinawa", the Game of Thrones pilot "Winter Is Coming", and Boardwalk Empire episodes "To the Lost", "Margate Sands", "Farewell Daddy Blues" and the series finale "Eldorado", winning the award for "To the Lost" in 2012.

Filmography

Television

Producer

Director
{| class="wikitable"
|- style="background:#ccc; text-align:center;"
! Year !! Show !! Season !! Episode title !! Episode number !! Original airdate !! Notes
|-
|rowspan=5|2020
|rowspan=5|Perry Mason
|rowspan=5|1
|"Chapter 1"
|1
|June 21, 2020
|
|-
|"Chapter 2"
|2
|June 28, 2020
|
|-
|"Chapter 3"
|3
|July 5, 2020
|
|-
|"Chapter 7"
|7
|August 2, 2020
|
|-
|"Chapter 8"
|8
|August 9, 2020
|
|-
|2017
|Black Mirror
|4
|"Hang the DJ"
|4
|December 29, 2017
|
|-
|rowspan=2|2014
|rowspan=14|Boardwalk Empire
|rowspan=2|5
|"Eldorado"
|8
|October 26, 2014
|Series Finale  Nominated—Primetime Emmy Award for Outstanding Directing for a Drama Series
|-
|"Golden Days for Boys and Girls"
|1
|September 7, 2014
|Season Premiere
|-
|rowspan=4|2013
|rowspan=4|4
|"Farewell Daddy Blues"
|12
|November 24, 2013
|Season Finale  Nominated—Primetime Emmy Award for Outstanding Directing for a Drama Series
|-
|"The Old Ship of Zion"
|8
|October 27, 2013
|
|-
|"Erlkönig"
|5
|October 6, 2013
|
|-
|"New York Sour"
|1
|September 8, 2013
|Season Premiere
|-
|rowspan=4|2012
|rowspan=4|3
|"Margate Sands"
|12
|December 2, 2012
|Season Finale  Nominated—Primetime Emmy Award for Outstanding Directing for a Drama Series
|-
|"The Pony"
|8
|November 4, 2012
|
|-
|"You'd Be Surprised"
|5
|October 14, 2012
|
|-
|"Resolution"
|1
|September 16, 2012
|Season Premiere
|-
|rowspan=6|2011
|rowspan=4|2
|"To the Lost"
|12
|December 11, 2011
|Season Finale  Primetime Emmy Award for Outstanding Directing for a Drama Series
|-
|"Two Boats and a Lifeguard"
|8
|November 13, 2011
|
|-
|"Gimcrack & Bunkum"
|5
|October 23, 2011
|
|-
|"21"
|1
|September 25, 2011
|Season Premiere
|-
|rowspan=2|Game of Thrones
|rowspan=2|1
|"The Kingsroad"
|2
|April 24, 2011
|
|-
|"Winter Is Coming"
|1
|April 17, 2011
|Series Premiere  Nominated—Primetime Emmy Award for Outstanding Directing for a Drama Series
|-
|rowspan=7|2010
|rowspan=4|Boardwalk Empire
|rowspan=4|1
|"A Return to Normalcy"
|12
|December 5, 2010
|Season Finale
|-
|"Family Limitation"
|6
|October 24, 2010
|
|-
|"Broadway Limited"
|3
|October 3, 2010
|
|-
|"The Ivory Tower"
|2
|September 26, 2010
|
|-
|rowspan=3|The Pacific
|rowspan=3|Miniseries
|"Okinawa"
|9
|May 9, 2010
|Nominated—Primetime Emmy Award for Outstanding Directing for a Miniseries, Movie, or Dramatic Special
|-
|"Peleliu Hills"
|7
|April 25, 2010
|
|-
|"Guadalcanal/Leckie"
|1
|March 14, 2010
|
|-
|rowspan=4|2007
|rowspan=3|The Sopranos
|rowspan=3|6 Part II
|"The Second Coming" 
|19
|May 20, 2007
|
|-
|"Chasing It"
|16
|April 29, 2007
|
|-
|"Soprano Home Movies"
|13
|April 8, 2007
|
|-
|Rome
|2
|"Passover"
|1
|January 14, 2007
|
|-
|rowspan=4|2006
|rowspan=4|The Sopranos
|rowspan=4|6 Part I
|"Cold Stones"
|11
|May 21, 2006
|
|-
|"Johnny Cakes"
|8
|April 30, 2006
|
|-
|"Live Free or Die"
|6
|April 17, 2006
|
|-
|"Members Only"
|1
|March 12, 2006
|Nominated—Primetime Emmy Award for Outstanding Directing for a Drama Series
|-
|rowspan=3|2005
|Rome
|1
|"Pharsalus"
|5
|October 9, 2005
|
|-
|Into the West
|Miniseries
|"Casualties of War|5
|July 15, 2005
|
|-
|Deadwood|2
|"Childish Things"
|7
|April 24, 2005
|
|-
|rowspan=6|2004
|The Wire|3
|"Back Burners"
|7
|November 7, 2004
|
|-
|rowspan=3|The Sopranos|rowspan=3|5
|"Long Term Parking"
|12
|May 23, 2004
|Nominated—Primetime Emmy Award for Outstanding Directing for a Drama Series
|-
|"Unidentified Black Males"
|9
|May 2, 2004
|
|-
|"Two Tonys"
|1
|March 7, 2004
|
|-
|rowspan=4|Sex and the City|rowspan=4|6
|"An American Girl in Paris, Part Deux"
|20
|February 22, 2004
|Series Finale
|-
|"An American Girl in Paris, Part Une"
|19
|February 15, 2004
|
|-
|rowspan=5|2003
|"Boy, Uninterrupted"
|10
|August 24, 2003
|
|-
|"A Woman's Right to Shoes"
|9
|August 17, 2003
|
|-
|The Wire|2
|"Stray Rounds"
|9
|July 27, 2003
|
|-
|Keen Eddie|1
|"The Amazing Larry Dunn"
|6
|July 8, 2003
|
|-
|rowspan=2|Ed|3
|"Second Chances"
|20
|March 28, 2003
|
|-
|rowspan=6|2002
|3
|"Neighbors"
|10
|December 18, 2002
|
|-
|rowspan=3|The Sopranos|rowspan=3|4
|"Calling All Cars"
|11
|November 24, 2002
|
|-
|"Whoever Did This"
|9
|November 10, 2002
|Nominated—Primetime Emmy Award for Outstanding Directing for a Drama Series
|-
|"Christopher"
|3
|September 29, 2002
|
|-
|The Wire|1
|"Sentencing"
|13
|September 8, 2002
|Season Finale
|-
|Pasadena|1
|"Puppy Love"
|5
|May 22, 2002
|
|-
|rowspan=6|2001
|Ed|2
|"Changes"
|2
|October 17, 2001
|
|-
|rowspan=2|The Sopranos|rowspan=2|3
|"Amour Fou"
|11
|May 13, 2001
|Nominated—Primetime Emmy Award for Outstanding Directing for a Drama Series
|-
|"Second Opinion"
|7
|April 8, 2001
|
|-
|Ed|1
|"The Test"
|18
|April 4, 2001
|
|-
|The Sopranos|3
|"Proshai, Livushka"
|2
|March 4, 2001
|
|-
|Ed|1
|"Opposites Distract"
|11
|January 17, 2001
|
|-
|rowspan=6|2000
|rowspan=3|Touched by an Angel|rowspan=3|6
|"Pandora's Box"
|26
|May 21, 2000
|Season Finale
|-
|"Monica's Bad Day"
|23
|April 30, 2000
|
|-
|"Living the Rest of My Life"
|21
|April 9, 2000
|
|-
|rowspan=3|The Sopranos|rowspan=3|2
|"House Arrest"
|11
|March 26, 2000
|
|-
|"Big Girls Don't Cry"
|5
|February 13, 2000
|
|-
|"Commendatori"
|4
|February 6, 2000
|
|-
|rowspan=10|1999
|Now and Again|1
|"Nothing to Fear, But Nothing to Fear"
|6
|November 5, 1999
|
|-
|rowspan=5|Touched by an Angel|6
|"Til Death Do Us Part"
|5
|October 24, 1999
|
|-
|rowspan=4|5
|"Godspeed"
|27
|May 23, 1999
|Season Finale
|-
|"Fighting the Good Fight"
|25
|May 9, 1999
|
|-
|"Black Like Monica"
|24
|May 2, 1999
|
|-
|"Into the Fire"
|20
|April 4, 1999
|
|-
|The Sopranos|1
|"The Legend of Tennessee Moltisanti"
|8
|February 28, 1999
|
|-
|rowspan=2|Touched by an Angel|rowspan=2|5
|"Family Business"
|17
|February 28, 1999
|
|-
|"On Edge"
|15
|February 14, 1999
|
|-
|Homicide: Life on the Street|7
|"A Case of Do or Die"
|14
|February 12, 1999
|
|-
|rowspan=7|1998
|Touched by an Angel|5
|"Only Connect"
|4
|October 11, 1998
|
|-
|New York Undercover|4
|"Sign o' the Times"
|10
|June 4, 1998
|
|-
|Touched by an Angel|4
|"The Spirit of Liberty Moon"
|26
|May 17, 1998
|2 hour Season Finale
|-
|rowspan=2|Promised Land|rowspan=2|2
|"When Darkness Falls"
|22
|April 30, 1998
|
|-
|"Undercover Granny"
|18
|March 26, 1998
|
|-
|New York Undercover|4
|"Rat Trap"
|6
|March 12, 1998
|
|-
|The Visitor|1
|"The Trial"
|12
|January 16, 1998
|
|-
|rowspan=7|1997
|rowspan=5|Touched by an Angel|rowspan=2|4
|"Great Expectations"
|2
|September 28, 1997
|
|-
|"The Road Home: Part 1"
|1
|September 21, 1997
|
|-
|rowspan=3|3
|"A Delicate Balance"
|29
|May 18, 1997
|Season Finale
|-
|"Full Moon"
|26
|May 4, 1997
|
|-
|"Missing in Action"
|24
|April 13, 1997
|
|-
|New York Undercover|3
|"Hubris"
|19
|March 27, 1997
|
|-
|rowspan=2|Touched by an Angel|rowspan=2|3
|"Angel of Death"
|17
|February 9, 1997
|
|-
|rowspan=7|1996
|"The Journalist"
|12
|December 1, 1996
|
|-
|Promised Land|1
|"Homecoming"
|9
|November 26, 1996
|
|-
|rowspan=9|Touched by an Angel|rowspan=2|3
|"Sins of the Father"
|4
|September 29, 1996
|
|-
|"Random Acts"
|3
|September 22, 1996
|
|-
|rowspan=6|2
|"Dear God"
|19
|March 9, 1996
|
|-
|"Rock n' Roll Dad"
|14
|January 20, 1996
|
|-
|"'Til We Meet Again"
|13
|January 13, 1996
|
|-
|rowspan=5|1995
|"In the Name of God"
|6
|October 28, 1995
|
|-
|"The Driver"
|4
|October 14, 1995
|
|-
|"Sympathy for the Devil"
|3
|October 7, 1995
|
|-
|1
|"In The Name Of God"
|12
|October 28, 1995
|
|-
|Homicide: Life on the Street|3
|"Nothing Personal"
|18
|April 21, 1995
|
|-
|rowspan=3|1994
|rowspan=3|Touched by an Angel|rowspan=3|1
|"The Hero"
|9
|December 25, 1994
|
|-
|"Manny"
|8
|December 14, 1994
|
|-
|"Fallen Angela"
|3
|October 12, 1994
|
|-
|1992
|Home Fires|1
|"A Bench Too Far"
|5
|July 11, 1992
|
|}

Writer

Actor
 The White Shadow (1978–1981; TV series): played Mario "Salami" Pettrino in 54 episodes
 Class of 1984 (1982 film): played Peter Stegman, the villainous teenager
 The Master (1984; TV series): played Max Keller in 13 episodes
 Escape from El Diablo (1984 film): played Pauli
 Zone Troopers (1985 film): played Joey
 The Wrong Guys (1988 film): played J.T.
 Catacombs (1988 film): played Father John Durham
 True Blue'' (1989–1990; TV series): played Sergeant Andy Wojeski in 12 episodes and the TV movie

References

External links
 
 

1959 births
Living people
20th-century American male actors
American male film actors
American people of Dutch descent
American male television actors
American television directors
Edgar Award winners
Hugo Award winners
Primetime Emmy Award winners
Writers Guild of America Award winners
Male actors from New York City
Writers from Brooklyn
People from Massapequa, New York
Television producers from New York City
American television writers
American male television writers
American people of English descent
Directors Guild of America Award winners
Screenwriters from New York (state)
Massapequa High School alumni
Van Patten family